The Sheffield to Hathersage turnpike was an early road through the English Peak District, which was improved by a turnpike trust in the 18th century.  The road may have originated as a Roman road.

Education
During the 18th century, Sheffield's expanding industry sought new customers and markets for their products. This provided for products to be transported to many locations which required samples and purchases. Existing communication with large towns in the south like Birmingham and London were adequate, but markets to the west were largely inaccessible. The moors, bogs, and steep escarpments called 'edges' of the high moorland plateau in the Dark Peak of the Peak District, made communications more difficult in the High Peak, Derbyshire. In 1758 the road from Little Sheffield over the moors to Hathersage which ran through Castleton to Sparrow Pit Gate on the Chapel-en-le-Frith Road was turnpiked. A distribution system was concurrently provided by carriers who were financed by enterprising captains of industry.

Chaps
Chaps were packhorse drivers who assembled at an inn adjoined the Cutlers' Hall, Church Street, Sheffield.

The journey via Ringinglow

Fording Porter Brook at 'Little Sheffield', the team climbed London Road to Heeley, thence up Sharrow Lane to Sharrow Head, pausing for water and refreshment at "The Stag's Head Inn", Psalter Lane. The toll-road continued past Brincliffe Quarry to Banner Cross, Ecclesall Road. (The old toll-house at Banner Cross was demolished in the early 1900s.) When a toll-bar was established at Hunters Bar this new section of toll-road along Ecclesall Road became a less arduous alternative route.

From Banner Cross the toll-road climbed Ringinglow Road to Bents Green where the "Hammer and Pincers" provided refreshment, water, and repairs to the animals' metal shoes. The hamlet of Ringinglow was served by another toll-booth, known colloquially as "The Round House" opposite "The Norfolk Arms".

Here the road turns south west over Houndkirk (a.k.a. Ankirk) Moor to "The Fox House" where huge Millstone Grit stone sets centered 4 ft. 8½ inches apart, prevented cart-wheels from sinking into the soft, peaty, moorland soil. (Reputedly established by Julius Caesar as Standard gauge for Roman chariots this measurement is still in use today and Houndkirk Road is still called "The Roman Road" by local people as is the Long Causeway, Lodge Moor.)

The journey via Stanage Edge

A further turnpike road to Hathersage and on into Derbyshire via Hope and Castleton ran through Lodge Moor over Stanage Edge where passengers had to disembark, assisting coachmen to unharness the team of horses and manhandle coaches over the precipitous gritstone escarpment.

Long Causeway, as the turnpike is now called, followed the old Roman road. It is widely believed that this track follows the line of a Roman road running from Templeborough to the fort at Navio (Brough-on-Noe), but archaeologists have cast doubt on this. During the early 19th century a section of the turnpike at Lodge Moor was lost when the three Redmires reservoirs were built by 'Sheffield Waterworks', after obtaining an Act of Parliament authorising their construction and an aqueduct to Hadfield Dam, Crookes was completed in 1830.

The demise of the turnpikes
In 1893 the Totley Tunnel (6,230-yards/3.5 miles/5.7 km long) was completed on the former London Midland and Scottish Railway (LMS) Manchester to Sheffield railway beneath Totley Moor making it the longest mainline railway tunnel in England, and rail-travel superseded the old turnpike routes.

See also
A625 road
Keighley and Kendal Road - the turnpike through Craven.

References

 Sheffield History
 Sheffield and Buxton Turpike Road. 1758. Road from Sheffield to Tideswell: Sheffield Archives, Fairbank Collection, F.B. 13, pp. 38–49; and F.B. 14, pp. 36–37.

Turnpike roads in the United Kingdom
Peak District